Bash Bish Falls State Park is a Massachusetts state park located in the town of Mount Washington. The park is named after Bash Bish Falls, Massachusetts' highest single-drop waterfall, which lies within its borders. The park is managed by the Department of Conservation and Recreation and is one of several nature preserves in the extreme southwestern corner of Massachusetts noted for their scenery. It is adjacent to the  Mount Washington State Forest, as well as New York's  Taconic State Park.

Bash Bish State Park consists of numerous gorges and an eastern hemlock ravine forest. The slopes around the waterfall are covered by forests of trees such as maple, oak, and beech. Wildlife includes the timber rattlesnake, the peregrine falcon, bobcats, black bears, and porcupines.

Activities and amenities
The park's recreational opportunities include scenic viewing, hiking, and fishing. To ensure public safety entering the water, swimming and rock climbing are prohibited. Leashed dogs are allowed on the trail and at the falls.  The falls can be reached via a moderately strenuous, half-mile, downhill trail. In all, there are three parking areas with trails of different lengths that provide access to the falls. The park is open from dawn to dusk.

References

External links

Bash Bish Falls State Park Department of Conservation and Recreation
Mt. Washington State Forest Map Department of Conservation and Recreation

Taconic Mountains
State parks of Massachusetts
State parks of the Appalachians
Massachusetts natural resources
Parks in Berkshire County, Massachusetts
Mount Washington, Massachusetts
1924 establishments in Massachusetts
Protected areas established in 1924